Ethyl may refer to:

Arts and entertainment 
 Cold Ethyl, a Swedish rock band
Ethyl Sinclair, a character in the Dinosaurs television show

Science and technology 
 Ethyl group, an organic chemistry moiety
 Ethyl alcohol (or ethanol)
 Ethyl Corporation, a fuel additive company 
 Tetraethyllead-treated gasoline

See also
 Ethel (disambiguation)